Thiago Julio Souza Alfano Moura (born 27 November 1995) is a Brazilian high jumper. He competed at the 2020 Summer Olympics.

At the 2022 World Indoor Championships, he finished 5th in the High Jump, with a 2.31 mark, a new South American indoor record, the same as the silver and bronze medalists. It's also the second best Brazilian high jump mark of all time, also considering outdoor competitions.

International competitions

References

External links

1995 births
Living people
Sportspeople from São Paulo
Athletes (track and field) at the 2020 Summer Olympics
Brazilian male high jumpers
Olympic athletes of Brazil
21st-century Brazilian people